The Province of Nova Scotia was heavily involved in the American Revolutionary War (1776–1783). At that time, Nova Scotia also included present-day New Brunswick until that colony was created in 1784. The Revolution had a significant impact on shaping Nova Scotia, "almost the 14th American Colony". At the beginning, there was ambivalence in Nova Scotia over whether the colony should join the Americans in the war against Britain. Largely as a result of American privateer raids on Nova Scotia villages, as the war continued, the population of Nova Scotia solidified their support for the British. Nova Scotians were also influenced to remain loyal to Britain by the presence of British military units, judicial prosecution by the Nova Scotia Governors and the efforts of Reverend Henry Alline.

Context 
In Nova Scotia a number of former New England residents objected to the Stamp Act 1765, but recent British immigrants and London-oriented business interests based in Halifax, the provincial capital, were more influential in keeping the colony loyal to the crown.  The only major public protest was the hanging in effigy of the stamp distributor and Lord Bute.  The act was implemented in both provinces, but Nova Scotia's stamp distributor resigned in January 1766, beset by ungrounded fears for his safety.  Authorities there were ordered to allow ships bearing unstamped papers to enter its ports, and business continued unabated after the distributors ran out of stamps.

1775–1778 
At the outbreak of the American Revolution, many Nova Scotians were New England-born and were sympathetic to the American Patriots. This support slowly eroded over the first two years of the war as American privateers attacked Nova Scotian villages and shipping to try to interrupt Nova Scotian trade with the American Loyalists still in New England. During the war, American privateers captured 225 vessels either leaving or arriving at Nova Scotia ports. In June 1775, the Americans had their first naval victory over the British in the Battle of Machias. In response to this defeat, in July 1775, the British sent from Halifax two armed sloops to Machias, Province of Massachusetts Bay to capture the rebels. American privateer Joseph O'Brien captured these two British vessels on 12 July 1775 in the Bay of Fundy. The following month American privateers from Machias executed their third consecutive victory in the region by raiding St John.

In retaliation for the American victories at Machias and St. John, the British executed the Burning of Falmouth (present-day Portland, Maine) in October 1775. (In the raid on Charlottetown, the privateers also sought revenge against Nathaniel Coffin, the Loyalist who cut down the Liberty Tree in Boston.) The first year of the war ended with the American privateer Raid on Yarmouth, Nova Scotia.

In 1775, rebellion began to ferment within Nova Scotia. Governor Legge began to target prominent Protestant dissenters of the St. Matthew's Church: John Fillis and judge William Smith and John Frost (minister). The Governor also targeted judge Seth Harding from the Liverpool Township and he left on October 1775 and did not return. According to Cahill, as a result of "instances of non-legal repression and petty tyranny, such as the summary dismissals of Judge Smith and Justice Frost, had ended with the recall of Governor Legge [to London] in January 1776."

A small number of Nova Scotians went south to serve with the Continental Army against the British; upon the completion of the war these rebels were granted land in the Refugee Tract in Ohio.

In 1776, there was also armed rebellion such as the Maugerville Rebellion (1776).  The other attack was by land and led by Jonathan Eddy who led the Battle of Fort Cumberland. According to historian Barry Cahill, this rebellion led the Nova Scotia government to "use the formal law in sedition trials for an essential aspect of the official response to the American Revolution."  The government arraigned dissenters John Seccombe and jailed Timothy Houghton for sedition (incitement to rebellion). Malachy Salter was convicted of sedition in 1777.

At the end of 1776, there were two significant American attacks on Nova Scotia. One of these assaults was by sea and led by John Paul Jones in the Raid on Canso (1776). In 1776, John Allan led the Maliseet to challenge the loyalists on Indian Island, New Brunswick to join the rebel cause. In 1776, two American privateers took four vessels at Cape Forchu, Nova Scotia and took the people of the hamlet prisoners.

In March 1777, in the first American Navy encounter with the British, the British ran the American vessel aground in the Battle off Yarmouth (1777) and the privateers escaped to find protection among the local village. The crew found support and the inhabitants of Yarmouth sheltered the American privateers from the British navy until they made their escape back to New England.  The engagement between the American privateers and local militia was one of several in the region. On 2 May 1777, in the Minas Basin Captain Collet ordered the capture the American privateer schooner Sea Duck, under the command of John Bohannan. He had the vessel taken to Windsor. In June, the American Patriots launched the St. John River expedition. In July 1777, HMS Amazon captured the privateer Active off of Cape Sable Island. In August 1777, the British raided Machias.

The following year, in April 1778 the American privateers again attacked Liverpool. On 9 August, Privateers attacked Cornwallis at present-day Kentville, which resulted in the British building Fort Hughes in the area.  The fort could hold 56 soldiers. In 1778, the British schooner Hope also destroyed a privateer ship at Canso.  Seven Patriots escaped but were later captured near Halifax. Prisoners were returned from Halifax to Boston on the Swift in September 1778. The Cartel Silver Eel took prisoners to Boston in October 1778. In 1779 Maugerville was raided again by Maliseets working with John Allan in Machias, Maine. A vessel was captured and two or three residents' homes were plundered.  In response, a blockhouse was built at the mouth of Oromocto River also named Fort Hughes (New Brunswick) (named after the Lieutenant Governor of Nova Scotia, Sir Richard Hughes). In June 1779, the British troops at Windsor captured 12 American privateers in the Bay of Fundy, where they cruised in a large boat, armed, plundering the vessels and the inhabitants.  In 1779, American privateers returned to Canso and destroyed the fisheries, which were worth £50,000 a year to Britain.

1779–1782 
In 1779 the British from Halifax adopted a strategy to seize parts of Maine, especially around Penobscot Bay, and make it a new colony to be called New Ireland. It was intended to be a permanent colony for Loyalists and a base for military action during the war.

In early July 1779, Francis McLean left Halifax and led a British naval and military force into Castine's commodious harbor, landed troops, and took control of the village. He began erecting Fort George on one of the highest points of the peninsula.  Alarmed by this incursion, the Commonwealth of Massachusetts sent the Penobscot Expedition to lay side to the fort and reclaim the territory. The siege started on July 25 and lasted three weeks until the arrival of British commander George Collier who crushed the American expedition. (The British held New Ireland, the planned loyalist homeland, until the end of the war. Instead, the British divided Nova Scotia and named the new Loyalist homeland New Brunswick.)

At the end of 1779, the British at Halifax experienced some significant losses. In December 1779 the schooner Hope wrecked near the Sambro Island Light on the Three Sisters Rocks. Captain Henry Baldwin and six other crew were killed. Weeks later, 170 British sailors were lost when two vessels – North and St Helena – were wrecked in a storm when entering Halifax harbour.

On 10 July 1780, in the Battle off Halifax, the British privateer brig Resolution (16 guns) under the command of Thomas Ross engaged the American privateer Viper (22 guns and 130 men) off Halifax at Sambro Light. In what one observer described as "one of the bloodiest battles in the history of privateering", the two privateers began a "severe engagement" during which both pounded each other with cannon fire for about 90 minutes. The engagement resulted in the surrender of the British ship and the death of up to 18 British and 33 American sailors.

In May 1781, the local Nova Scotia militia defeated American privateers in the Battle off Cape Split. The British and French also clashed in the Naval battle off Cape Breton. Finally, the privateers returned in the Raid on Annapolis Royal (1781). In the final year of attacks on Nova Scotia, the American privateers fought in the Naval battle off Halifax and the Raid on Lunenburg (1782).

Defence regiments 

To guard against American privateer attacks, the 84th Regiment of Foot (Royal Highland Emigrants) (2nd battalion) was garrisoned at forts around  Atlantic Canada. Fort Edward (Nova Scotia) in Windsor, Nova Scotia was the Regiment's headquarters to prevent a possible American land assault on Halifax from the Bay of Fundy. Also raised in Nova Scotia were the Royal Fencible American Regiment and the Royal Nova Scotia Volunteer Regiment. The King's Orange Rangers defended Liverpool, the second largest settlement in the colony. The Hessians also served in Nova Scotia for five years (1778–1783). They protected the colony from American privateers, such as when they responded to the Raid on Lunenburg (1782). They were led by Baron Oberst Franz Carl Erdmann von Seitz. There were 5000 British troops in Nova Scotia by 1778.

Naval defence 
In terms of naval force, along with issuing letters of marque for different privateering vessels, in 1776 the Government also retained the armed schooner Loyal Nova Scotian (8 guns, 28 men).  On Nov. 26, 1776, under the command of John Alexander, the Loyal Nova Scotian re-captured the privateer Friendship. In 1778, the vessel was ordered to Lunenburg and then retired.  By 1779, Nova Scotia's naval defence had four vessels: a frigate (32 guns), sloop of war (18 guns), armed schooner (14 guns) and another armed schooner (10 guns).  These ships were named Revenge (18 guns, 50 men, Captain Jones Fawson; Captain James Gandy), Buckram (8 guns, 20 men, Captain Archibald Allardice) and the armed schooner Insulter (Captain John Sheppard), all acting under government orders. There were numerous other privateers supported by local villages: Enterprise (Liverpool), Hero (100 men, 16 guns, Captain Bailey, Chester), Arbuthnot, The David, Mowatt, Lady Hammond, The Fly, Sir George Hammond, Lancaster, Dreadnought (Captain Dean of Liverpool), The Success, The Lively, the sloop Howe, and the ship Jack.

In 1778, Nova Scotians ships had taken at least 48 prizes and four recaptures. Between 1779 and 1781, they captured 42.

Treaty of Watertown 
In 1776, the Mi'kmaq signed the Treaty of Watertown, agreeing to support the American Patriots against the American Loyalists. Three years later, on 7 June 1779, the Mi'kmaq "delivered up" the Watertown treaty to Nova Scotia Governor Michael Francklin and re-established Mi'kmaw loyalty to the British. After the British resounding victory over the American Penobscot Expedition, according to Mi'kmaw historian Daniel Paul, Mi'kmaq in present-day New Brunswick renounced the Watertown treaty and signed a treaty of alliance with the British on 24 September 1779.

American Revolution gallery

St. John's Island and Newfoundland  
The population of St. John's Island (present-day Prince Edward Island), small compared to Nova Scotia, was only about 1215 in 1774. Nova Scotia has been described as a 'shield' to the other two colonies, stopping much unrest from the American colonies from reaching them. St. John's Island during the time has been described as "a model colony".

At the outbreak of the American Revolution, Phillips Callback was in charge of St. Johns Island. Thomas Gage began recruiting men to help defend Quebec against American attack; however, his efforts were hindered by a group of American revolutionaries living in Pictou, Nova Scotia. A group of about 150 American soldiers set out to attack ships bringing arms to the British. Though they failed in their attempt, they arrived in Pictou, and from the Americans living there learned about recruiting efforts, and attacked Charlottetown. They threatened to set fire to the town but Callback convinced them to spare the town. Callback and Thomas Wright (the surveyor of the island) were taken prisoner. The two hostages were eventually released, and made it back to the island on May 1, 1776.

After the attack, an armed brig was sent to guard St. John's Island, and a militia was raised. The brig left when  arrived in September 1776. A fort was planned to better defend the town than Fort Amherst could. After Eddy's raid, the militia (which had only existed as 20 men previously) was raised to 80, and named The Loyal Island of St. John Volunteers. In 1778, five companies under Timothy Hierlihy were sent to better garrison the island. At the troops' arrival, Callback was ordered to disband the "superfluous and expensive" militia. He ignored the orders. The feasibility of attacking St. John's was considered by the French navy.

The Island, despite perceived danger, served mainly as a stopping point for British troops on their way out from Quebec, and British troops bringing captured privateers back. A group of 200 Hessians en route to Quebec spent a year on the Island. Work on the fort continued until Patterson (the governor) arrived in 1780. He saw the five companies and 8,000 pounds which had been spent on fortifications as a colossal waste of money. Work was halted and the companies returned. Throughout the war, the island was highly loyal, and endured few attacks.

In 1765, Newfoundland's population was around 15,000, consisting largely of Irish immigrants. As it was not technically a colony, Newfoundland did not pay the Stamp Act 1765 or Townshend Acts taxes. Despite having minor problems with the British government, the island "preserved a tone of exemplary loyalty." The island maintained nearly no defences, and as such, Esek Hopkins was sent to attack Newfoundland. In September 1776, a group of several privateers took three or four ships, and plundered about ten others. In 1777,  was captured, and several months later retaken.

Upon the arrival of Richard Edwards, many privateers were defeated, and by 1779, very few were left. Edwards ordered cannon distributed to allow towns to defend themselves against attack. In early 1780, at Mortier, a privateer was repulsed by the town. That same year, a fleet, led by Edwards, of nine ships, captured six privateers. Fourteen were captured the next year. Several companies were raised, and several hundred soldiers left to fight with British troops.

Both islands had minor food shortages, particularly after a fire on St. Johns burnt 35 houses, and many stores of food. The fishing industries in both were reduced to "low and miserable state[s]," and the general population of both decreased as well. An outbreak of robberies occurred as people needed various resources. A riot occurred in 1779 on St. John's, in which one person was killed.

Loyalist settlements 
About 20,000 Loyalists fled to Nova Scotia during and after the American Revolution.  Most came from the state of New York.  The three largest settlements being Saint John River Valley, Digby, Nova Scotia and Shelburne, Nova Scotia. Cape Breton was a separate colony as received 3150 Loyalists. Ile St. Jean received 300 Loyalist refugees. The British returned New Ireland to the Americans and the territory in Maine entered the control of the newly independent American state of Massachusetts. Those from New Ireland settled St. Andrews, New Brunswick. With the Loyalist homeland gone, Nova Scotia was divided to accommodate the Loyalists: both New Brunswick and Cape Breton were created as separate colonies for the Loyalists (Cape Breton returned to Nova Scotia in 1820).

There are many Loyalists who settled in Halifax and were buried in the Old Burying Ground (Halifax, Nova Scotia), including a number of Black Loyalists who have unmarked graves.

Numerous British soldiers became Loyalists and their regiments settled in various communities across Nova Scotia.  The Royal Fencible American Regiment settled in Wallace, Nova Scotia. The Second Battalion of the 84th Regiment of Foot (Royal Highland Emigrants) settled in Municipality of East Hants, particularly at Kennetcook, Nova Scotia.

There were three Regiments that settled Digby, Nova Scotia: New Jersey Volunteers, the Royal Garrison Battalion and the Loyal American Regiment. Black Pioneers settled in Brindley Town, (now Acaciaville, Nova Scotia).

The Black Pioneers settled at Annapolis Royal, Nova Scotia. The Hessians also settled Annapolis Royal and other places in Nova Scotia.

At Guysborough, Nova Scotia there were six regiments that settled: Jamaica Rangers, Jamaica Volunteers, Negro Horse, Royal North Carolina Regiment, Duke of Cumberland's Regiment and the North Carolina Highlanders. East Country Harbour, Nova Scotia was settled by three regiments: the Royal North Carolina Regiment, the King's Carolina Rangers (see Joseph Marshall) and the South Carolina Royalists.

The Royal Nova Scotia Volunteer Regiment settled Ship Harbour, Nova Scotia and Antigonish, Nova Scotia.

The King's Orange Rangers settled in Middleton, Nova Scotia.

Communities named after Loyalist Leaders 
 Parrsboro, Nova Scotia, John Parr
 Guysborough, Nova Scotia (Guy's borough), Guy Carleton, 1st Baron Dorchester)
 Carleton Corner
 Carleton Village, Nova Scotia
 Birchtown, Nova Scotia, Brigadier-General Samuel Birch, compiler of the Book of Negroes 
 Rawdon, Nova Scotia, Francis Rawdon-Hastings
Digby, Nova Scotia, Admiral Robert Digby (Royal Navy officer)
 Abercrombie, Nova Scotia, General James Abercrombie
 Tiddville, Nova Scotia, Samuel Tidd, a private for Col. Beverley Robinson
 Gilbert Cove, Nova Scotia, Lt. Thomas Gilbert
 Barton, Nova Scotia, Lt. Col. Joseph Barton (military officer)
 Russell Lake, Nova Scotia, Nathaniel Russell
 Wentworth, Nova Scotia, Sir John Wentworth, 1st Baronet
 Wentworth Valley, Nova Scotia
 Wentworth Station, Nova Scotia
Douglas, Nova Scotia, Sir Charles Douglas, 1st Baronet
 Seccombes Island, Nova Scotia, Rev. John Seccombe
 Allendale, Nova Scotia, James Allen
 Ballantynes Cove, Antigonish, (David Ballentine, 82nd Regiment)
 Balls Creek, Nova Scotia, (Ingram Ball, 33rd Regiment)

See also 
Military history of Nova Scotia

Notes

References

Bibliography
Records of the Vice Admiralty Court - American Revolution and War of 1812
  Neil MacKinnon. This Unfriendly Soil: The Loyalist Experience in Nova Scotia, 1783–1791. McGill-Queen's Press. 1986.
 Nova Scotia on the road to the Revolution
   
 
 
 
 
 
 
 
Loyalists - New Hampshire to Annapolis. 1916.
 Weld, Allen. Massachusetts Privateers in the American Revolution. 1911
Marines in the Revolution :a history of the Continental Marines in the American Revolution, 1775-1783
Adam Short - Nova Scotia and the American Revolution. 1914.
  American Privateers off Nova Scotia, Naval Documents of the American Revolution, p. 1204
Military operations in eastern Maine and Nova Scotia during ... Kidder, Frederic, 1804-1885.
Naval Documents and the American Revolution. Vol. 1-9. Naval History and Heritage Command

 
History of Nova Scotia
Military history of Nova Scotia
Northern theater of the American Revolutionary War